Teddy Okereafor (born 11 November 1992) is a British professional basketball player for the Cheshire Phoenix of the British Basketball League (BBL). Okereafor played college basketball for Virginia Commonwealth University and Rider University. He is also a member of the Great Britain Men's National team.

High school career
Okereafor attended the Christchurch School in Christchurch, Virginia where he led his high school team to a 23-6 record as the Virginia Prep League Player of the Year. He earned First Team All-State, averaging 13.1 points and 7.2 assists.

College career
After graduating from Christchurch School, Okereafor played two years of college basketball for VCU. After the 2012–13 season, Dillard transferred to Rider. He had to sit out one season under NCAA rules. He was named to the All-MAAC Second Team, as a junior and to the All-MAAC Third Team, as a senior.

Professional career
Okereafor went undrafted in the 2016 NBA draft. On 2 November 2016 he signed a one-year deal with Pärnu of the Korvpalli Meistriliiga. On 2 December 2016 he left Pärnu and joined Pistoia 2000, signing a short-term deal with the club.

On 17 August 2017 he signed with Kymis of Greece for the 2017–18 season. Okereafor finished out the season with Fortitudo Bologna.

On 28 June 2018 he signed with Holargos of the Greek Basket League.

On 25 August 2019 Okereafor signed with Iraklis; on 26 February 2020 he was released from the Greek club.

On 18 November 2020 Okereafor signed a short-term contract with the Bristol Flyers for the 2020–21 BBL season. On 25 May 2021 he signed with the Cheshire Phoenix.

National team career
Okereafor made his debut for the Great Britain Men's National Team in a closed international test match against New Zealand in 2015. Since then, Teddy has featured in every game Great Britain has played. He participated at EuroBasket 2017 and was one of the best players for Great Britain, averaging 9.6 points, 4.8 assists, and 4.2 rebounds per game.

References

External links
RealGM.com Profile
Draftexpress.com Profile
ESPN.com Profile 
Rider Profile

1992 births
Living people
Basketball players from Greater London
Bristol Flyers players
British expatriate basketball people in Italy
British expatriate basketball people in the United States
English men's basketball players
British expatriate basketball people in Estonia
British expatriate basketball people in Greece
Cheshire Phoenix players
Fortitudo Pallacanestro Bologna players
Greek Basket League players
Iraklis Thessaloniki B.C. players
Holargos B.C. players
KK Pärnu players
Korvpalli Meistriliiga players
Kymis B.C. players
Lega Basket Serie A players
Pistoia Basket 2000 players
Rider Broncs men's basketball players
VCU Rams men's basketball players
Point guards
Black British sportsmen